Zavaroni is a surname. Notable people with the surname include:

 Lena Zavaroni (1963–1999), Scottish singer and television show host
 Othello Zavaroni (1910–1991), French architect